Blood Orgy of the She-Devils is a 1973 American horror film directed by Ted V. Mikels.

Plot synopsis
Lorraine and Mark enter the world of witchcraft where Mara foretells the future and helps them remember their past lives. When a series of mysterious murders begin to occur, they turn to Dr. Helsford for advice.

Cast
Leslie McRay as Lorraine
Tom Pace as Mark
Lila Zaborin as Mara
Victor Izay as Dr. Helsford
William Bagdad as Toruqe

Production
Mikels later recalled:
I did about a three year  research on witchcraft, everything from psycometiy, to the study of the great witches of the past and the mysticisms that concern witches and sorcery. I wrote this after I went to seances. Usually when I write a script I try to isolate myself from everything and everybody, but would you believe, after three years of research, and notebooks full of material, I wrote the script in five days. It’s the only movie I’ve ever made where I did not change one word, not of the dialog, not of the story, I didn’t add or delete anything, I did it precisely as I wrote it.

References

External links
Blood Orgy of the She Devils at IMDb
Blood Orgy of the She Devils at Letterbox DVD

1973 films
1973 horror films
1970s English-language films
American exploitation films
American supernatural horror films
Films about witchcraft
Films about cults
Films directed by Ted V. Mikels
1970s American films